The 2002 bombings in Makassar, Indonesia  occurred on December 5, 2002, where a bomb exploded within inner-city McDonald's restaurant. The McDonald’s restaurant was located in the Ratu Indah shopping mall, in Makassar. These bomb actions were conducted by the Islamic group “Laskar Jundullah”, which caused death to 3 people, including the bomber himself, and injured 15 others. The leader of the group, Agung Abdul Hamid, received a jail sentence of 18 years due to the planning and execution of both the bomb and the attack in Makassar. There is police confirmation that the Islamic group, behind the McDonald's attack in Makassar, was Laskar Jundullah Islamic Militia, where many of their beliefs and values reflect and stem from those of The 'Jamaah Islamiyah' Islamic Group.

The bombings 
The McDonald’s bombing, on the December 5, 2002, occurred on the evening of Eid al-Fitr festival, marking the end of Ramadan – The fasting month for Muslims. The event caused death to 3 people and injured 15 others. Police say these 3 deaths included one of the bombers from the Islamic group Laskar Jundullah. On this same day, the McDonald’s bombings in Makassar was only one of the two to occur, where another bombing took place at a car dealership, a few miles from the McDonald’s. It was reported that no one was injured at this event, however the two events are closely linked through location and meaning.

These bombings, occurring in both the McDonald's store and the car dealership, and thought to be in relation to the peace agreement and support given by the Indonesia's Vice President, Jusuf Kalla. In the United Nations General Assembly, Kalla promoted the idea that peace "must be developed and nurtured through dialogue, inclusiveness, peaceful settlement of disputes, and non-use of force", in which is believed to have been a potential driver in the actions of the Laskar Jundullah group. Kalla owns both the McDonald's store and car dealership in Makassar, where the bombings act as a threat towards the Vice President in relation to his peace phenomena. Another potential driver would be the threat the Indonesia politics as a whole, where the terrorists completed these actions as an attempt to be higher recognised by society and the media.

Suspects and sentencing 
From these explosion, suspects Agung Abdul Hamid (36 years) and Munir Ansori (28 years) were questioned at Yogyakarta Police Station. From the South Sulawesi Regional Political Anti-Terror team, the arrests of these two suspects were led by the Adjunct Commissioner of Police Triatmojo, in which they asked 50 questions to both the suspects. Agung Hamid was arrested on 3rdOctober 2004 in Jalan Mangkubumi Yogyakarta, and Munir Ansori was arrested on the 27th of September 2004, in Jalan Mageland, Blunyah Tegarejo. Both of the suspects were flown, using the Bouraq commercial aircraft, to Makassar from Aadi Sucipto Airport.

Prior to the arrest, Agung disguised himself as an onion trader moving from town to town, whilst Munir disguised as a used goods conveyor at Klithikan, a Yogyakarta traditional market. During the interrogation of both suspects, Police were able to collect information about the attack, gaining confirmation in the suspicions of Agung Hamid having a significant involvement in the 2002 McDonald’s Bombings in the Ratu Indah Shopping mall. On the August 15, 2005, several years after the bombings, Agung Hamid was trailed at the Makassar District Court, where the judges ruled him as guilty and was sentenced to life imprisonment.

Agung Hamid was not the only individual involved in the bombings in Makassar. Anton Bin Labbase and Ilham Riady were charged with the overall planning of the McDonald’s bombings in Makassar, along with Agung. Ilham Riady received 8 years imprisonment for his involvement in the McDonald's bombings, killing three people. Another individual, Galazi Bin Abdul Somad, a Muslim Militant, was heavily involved in the Makassar bombings through the role of transporting the explosives to the actual bombers. He received a sentence of 18 years in jail due to these actions.

Connection to Bali bombings 
National Police detectives have incentives that there is a strong link between the Makassar and Bali bombings, to which both of the attacks have been blamed on the Jamaah Islamiyah (JI) terror group. There has been a strong suspicious that the main targets of both these attacked are targeted at American and Australian symbols – McDonald’s developing from the Western culture, and Bali being a strong Western tourist destination.

Furthermore, it is confirmed the Bali Bombings occurred as a result of the actions from the Islamic group Jemaah Islamiyah. This further indicates the potential link between Makassar McDonald’s bombings and the Bali Bombings, both in 2002, as Laskar Jundullah stemmed from the practices and beliefs of Jemaah Islamiyah. There are no official police statements stating these events link together however.

References 

Terrorist incidents in Indonesia in 2002
Islamic terrorist incidents in 2002
Makassar
Mass murder in 2002